Lady is a Four Letter Word is a Canadian current affairs television series which aired on CBC Television in 1975.

Premise
This Ottawa-produced series on women's issues was hosted by Elizabeth Gray with announcer Bob Carl. Topics such as home and workplace, marriage and singleness were featured. A highlight of the series was that persons deemed sexist were written on an "honour roll" of toilet paper.

Scheduling
This half-hour series was initially aired locally from 20 January 1975. It was broadcast on the national network Fridays at 1:00 p.m. (Eastern) from 11 April to 30 May 1975.

References

External links
 

CBC Television original programming
1975 Canadian television series debuts
1975 Canadian television series endings